Servando Ruiz-Gómez y González-Llanos (27 February 1821 in Avilés, Spain – 19 August 1888 in Vigo, Spain) was a Spanish politician, lawyer and journalist who served as Minister of State from 1883 to 1884, in a liberal cabinet headed by José de Posada y Herrera.

References
www.xtec.es Servando Ruiz Gómez

|-

Economy and finance ministers of Spain
Foreign ministers of Spain
Liberal Party (Spain, 1880) politicians
1821 births
1888 deaths
Civil governors of Madrid